The Cima del Serraglio is a mountain of the Ortler Alps, located on the border between Italy and Switzerland. It lies between the lake of Livigno (Lombardy) and the Val Mora (Graubünden).

References

External links
 Cima del Serraglio on Hikr

Mountains of the Alps
Mountains of Switzerland
Mountains of Lombardy
Italy–Switzerland border
International mountains of Europe
Mountains of Graubünden
Ortler Alps
Two-thousanders of Switzerland
Zernez